Zamolxis is a genus of assassin bugs (family Reduviidae), in the subfamily Harpactorinae.

Species
 Zamolxis gracilis 
 Zamolxis pallidiventris

References

Reduviidae
Cimicomorpha genera